This is a list of Estonian television related events from 1968.

Events

Debuts

Television shows

Ending this year

Births
4 February - Marko Matvere, actor and singer

Deaths